Beşgöze can refer to:

 Beşgöze, Gerger
 Beşgöze, Tercan